Electoral district no. 4 was one of the multi-member electoral districts of the Riigikogu, the national legislature of Estonia. The district was established in 1992 when the Riigikogu was re-established following Estonia's independence from the Soviet Union. It was abolished in 1995. It covered east Tallinn.

Election results

Detailed

1992
Results of the 1992 parliamentary election held on 20 September 1992:

The following candidates were elected:
 Personal mandates - Paul-Eerik Rummo (I), 5,290 votes.
 Compensatory mandates - Tiina Benno (EK), 458 votes; Aivar Kala (I), 631 votes; Kalev Kukk (R), 365 votes; Uno Mereste (M), 2,976 votes; and Siiri Oviir (R), 2,749 votes.

References

04
04
04
Riigikogu electoral district, 4